The color pearl is a pale tint of off-white.  It is a representation of the average color of a pearl.

The first recorded use of pearl as a color name in English was in 1604.

The color is used in interior design when an off-white tint is desired.

Cultured pearl

Cultured pearl is one of crayon colors issued by Crayola in its 16-pack of Pearl Brite Crayons. It has same hex number with the color White smoke.

See also
 List of colors

References

Shades of white